Carl Wilson is the debut solo album of The Beach Boys' band member, Carl Wilson. The youngest of the three Wilson brothers in the band, Carl Wilson was reportedly at this time unhappy with the progress being made by The Beach Boys creatively. So Carl, just as his brother Dennis had a few years earlier, signed a solo contract with James William Guercio's CBS-distributed Caribou Records, which four years prior put out brother Dennis's album Pacific Ocean Blue, and was also the current label of The Beach Boys. The album was released on March 27, 1981 and peaked at number 185 on the Billboard 200. Of the eight tracks on the album, seven of them are written by Carl Wilson and Myrna Smith, who was the wife of Carl's then manager Jerry Schilling, with the remaining track being co-written by Carl, Myrna and Michael Sun.

Track listing
All tracks composed by Carl Wilson and Myrna Smith; except where indicated

Side one
 "Hold Me" – 4:03
 "Bright Lights" – 3:47
 "What You Gonna Do About Me?" – 4:25
 "The Right Lane" – 5:13

Side two
 "Hurry Love" – 4:44
 "Heaven" (Carl Wilson, Myrna Smith, Michael Sun) – 4:23
 "The Grammy" – 3:04
 "Seems So Long Ago" – 4:56

Personnel
Carl Wilson – vocals, guitar, keyboards
Myrna Smith – vocals
James William Guercio - producer, bass, guitar, percussion
John Daly – guitar
Gerald Johnson – bass guitar
James Stroud – drums, percussion
Randy McCormick – keyboards
Joel Peskin – saxophone
Alan Krigger – drums, tambourine
Engineered by Wayne Tarnowski, assisted by David "Gino" Giorgini

References

1981 debut albums
Carl Wilson albums
Albums produced by James William Guercio
Caribou Records albums